The 1958 World Judo Championships were the 2nd edition of the Men's World Judo Championships, and were held in Tokyo, Japan on 30 November, 1958.

Medal overview

Men

Medal table

References

World Championships
World Championships 1958
J
World Judo Championships
World Judo Championships
J
Sports competitions in Tokyo